Kirk Bryan Jr. (born July 21, 1929), son of Kirk Bryan, Sr.(geologist, 1888–1950) is an American oceanographer who is considered to be the founder of numerical ocean modeling. Starting in the 1960s at the Geophysical Fluid Dynamics Laboratory, then located in Washington, D.C., Bryan worked with a series of colleagues to develop numerical schemes for solving the equations of motion describing flow on a sphere. His work on these schemes led to the so-called "Bryan-Cox code" with which many early simulations were made, and which led to the Modular Ocean Model currently used by many numerical oceanographers and climate scientists.

In addition to his important contributions in developing numerical codes, Bryan was also involved in early efforts to apply them to understanding the global climate system. In 1967, he published, with Michael Cox, the first model of the 3-dimensional circulation of the ocean, forced by both winds and thermodynamic forcing.  In 1969, a paper with Syukuro Manabe was the first to present integrations of a fully coupled atmosphere-ocean model, demonstrating the importance of ocean heat transport to the climate. This work was named one of the top ten breakthroughs in the history of the National Oceanographic and Atmospheric Administration. Bryan's 1971 paper with the noted dynamicist Adrian Gill demonstrated the important role played by bottom topography in setting the structure of the global ocean circulation, and played a major role in suggesting links between changes in continental topography and climate, continuing a long-term interest in the role of oceanic heat transport in determining global climate. Dr. Bryan was a lead author of the "Transient Climate Change" section of the 1989 scientific assessment report to the Intergovernmental Panel on Climate Change.

Bryan has been awarded the Maurice Ewing Medal of the American Geophysical Union for his contributions to the field of ocean science.
 2023 Alexander Agassiz Medal

Notable scientific papers

 Manabe, S.; Bryan, K. (1969), "Climate Calculation with a combined ocean-atmosphere model," Journal of the Atmospheric Sciences, 26(4), 786–789, https://doi.org/10.1175/1520-0469(1969)026<0786:CCWACO>2.0.CO;2

References

External links
 http://celebrating200years.noaa.gov/breakthroughs/climate_model/welcome.html#model
 http://www.agu.org/inside/honors.html#Ewing
 http://www.gfdl.noaa.gov/bibliography/results.php?author=1003
 Oral History interview transcript with Kirk Bryan on 20 December 1989, American Institute of Physics, Niels Bohr Library & Archives

American oceanographers
1929 births
Living people
Foreign Members of the Russian Academy of Sciences
Sverdrup Gold Medal Award Recipients